Cheirolepis (from  , 'hand' and   'scale') is an extinct genus of ray-finned fish that lived in the Devonian period of Europe and North America. It is the only genus yet known within the family Cheirolepidae and the order Cheirolepiformes. It was among the most basal of the Devonian actinopterygians and is considered the first to possess the "standard" dermal cranial bones seen in later actinopterygians.

It had a streamlined body with small, triangular ganoid scales similar to those of the  Acanthodii. These scales had a basic structure typical of many early osteichthyans, with a superficial of ganoine overlying dentine, and a basal plate of bone. Cheirolepis had well-developed fins which gave it speed and stability, and was probably an active predator. Based on the size of its eyes, it hunted by sight. Cheirolepis'''s jaws, lined with sharp teeth, could be opened very wide, allowing it to swallow prey two thirds of its own size.

Species
 
Six possible species of Cheirolepis are currently known. The type species, named in 1835, is C. trailli. Remains of this species have been found from Scotland and date back to the Eifelian and Givetian stages of the Middle Devonian. C. canadensis was described in 1881 from material found in Miguasha, Canada that dated back to the middle Frasnian stage of the Late Devonian. Two species, C. gracilis and C. gaugeri, have been found from Germany and Belarus in deposits that are of Givetian age. They were first described in 1973 from scale material that is now of questionable validity. Another species has been found from Belarus that lived during the Eifelian, and has been named C. sinualis. A new species has recently been described from a locality in Red Hill, Nevada deposited during the Mid-Late Devonian boundary. The specimen from which this species was named, consisting of scales and a lower jaw, was originally referred to C. canadensis''. New, more complete specimens have shown it to be distinct from the type, although a species name is yet to be given for the remains.

References

External links
Cheirolepis at Palaeos

Prehistoric ray-finned fish genera
Devonian fish of North America
Taxa named by Louis Agassiz
Fossil taxa described in 1835